Taczanowski's Oldfield mouse (Thomasomys taczanowskii) is a species of rodent in the family Cricetidae.
It is found only in Peru.

References

Musser, G. G. and M. D. Carleton. 2005. Superfamily Muroidea. pp. 894–1531 in Mammal Species of the World a Taxonomic and Geographic Reference. D. E. Wilson and D. M. Reeder eds. Johns Hopkins University Press, Baltimore.

Thomasomys
Mammals described in 1882
Taxonomy articles created by Polbot
Taxa named by Oldfield Thomas